Senegalisia is a monotypic genus of beetles in the family Buprestidae, the jewel beetles. It was erected in 1987 for a species separated from the genus Anthaxia and renamed Senegalisia semireticulata. It is native to Senegal.

References

Monotypic Buprestidae genera
Beetles of Africa